Wolfgang Unger (31 December 1948 – 19 April 2004) was a German conductor, especially a choral conductor, and an academic in Halle and Leipzig. He founded several choirs and focused on the music of Johann Sebastian Bach and his contemporaries. Like Bach, he directed the music at the University of Leipzig, called Leipziger Universitätsmusik.

Career 
Born in Eibenstock, Unger was educated at the Kreuzschule in Dresden. He was a member of the Kreuzchor under Rudolf Mauersberger, serving as Erster Chorpräfekt from 1965 to 1967. He studied conducting, including choral conducting, at the Musikhochschule Weimar.

In 1969, he founded the choir , which he conducted until 1996. He was appointed Kapellmeister and choral conductor at the Philharmonisches Staatsorchester Halle. He was awarded the town's Handel Prize in 1985.

In 1987, Unger became artistic director of the Leipziger Universitätschor, and in 1991,  of the University of Leipzig, where he also taught choral conducting at the Hochschule für Musik und Theater "Felix Mendelssohn Bartholdy" Leipzig and at the Leipzig University.

He was interim Thomaskantor from 1991 after the resignation of Hans-Joachim Rotzsch. Unger revived the Leipziger Universitätsmusik by creating the Pauliner Kammerorchester in 1992 and the Pauliner Barockensemble in 1994, both named after the original Paulinerkirche, which was dynamited by the East German regime in 1968. In the discussion about the development of the campus, Unger supported the reconstruction of the church. In 2003, he was appointed extraordinary professor (Außerplanmäßiger Professor).

Unger recorded secular cantatas by Bach in 2000 with the Leipziger Universitätschor and the Pauliner Barockensemble, the 1719 Die Zeit, die Tag und Jahre macht, BWV 134a, and the 1735 Die Freude reget sich, BWV 36b. He recorded works by Hugo Distler, including Liturgische Sätze (Liturgical movements) with the Leipziger Universitätschor and the Pauliner Kammerochester  in 2001.

Unger died from cancer on 19 April 2004 in Halle (Saale). A memorial service was held at the Thomaskirche on 26 April with three choirs, the Thüringischer Akademischer Singkreis, Thomanerchor and Leipziger Universitätschor. On Totensonntag that year, a memorial concert was given at the Thomaskirche by "his" choirs conducted by Ulf Wellner, and with his son  as the organist. Wolfgang Unger had often conducted concerts on that occasion, as a statement of faith under the GDR regime. His son wrote a biography titled Wolfgang Unger: Leben für die Musik (W. U.: Live for Music), in 2011.

Publication 
 Wege zum Dirigieren. Die Grundlagen der Dirigiertechnik. Edition Merseburger, Kassel 2001,

References

External links 

 
 
 Wolfgang Unger (Conductor) Bach Cantatas Website 2006
 Wolfgang Unger & Leipziger Universitätschor / Pauliner Barockensemble / Bach Cantatas & Other Vocal Works Bach Cantatas Website 2015
 Grabmal Wolfgang Unger friedhofsspaziergang-leipzig.de

1948 births
2004 deaths
People educated at the Kreuzschule
Hochschule für Musik Franz Liszt, Weimar alumni
German male conductors (music)
German choral conductors
Academic staff of the University of Music and Theatre Leipzig
Academic staff of Leipzig University
People from Eibenstock
20th-century German conductors (music)
20th-century German male musicians
Handel Prize winners